Manila Boy is a 1993 Filipino crime action comedy-drama film which starring Robin Padilla, Tony Ferrer, Aurora Sevilla, Andy Poe, Berting Labra, Rommel Padilla and Judy Ann Santos. Directed by Arturo San Agustin under Pioneer Films.

Plot
This is a story about Diego (Robin Padilla), a wacky provincial man from Zambales. He gets to find a job and ends up working to Manila for Mang Berto (Berting Labra) and finding Mang Berto's long time friend Sibuboy (Val Iglesia) the two met Diego and thanked him for helping him and he willingly worked with Sibuboy as his business partner. Suddenly Mang Berto escapes when the cops captured Diego and Sibuboy as a gun runners. Then Ragoy (Romy Diaz) and his men prepared to release Diego and Sibuboy  out of jail and they ended up working for a millionaire kingpin Señor Escudero (Tony Ferrer) as their big boss and they get involved with his enemies and drug smuggling, sex trafficking, hoodlum in roads, and illegal gambling for Señor Escudero's businesses with Gonzalo (Paquito Diaz) who takes care of Señor Escudero's businesses. Diego gets an alias and becomes the hitman named Manila Boy.

Cast

Manila Boy Movie was disqualified
Robin Padilla's movie was disqualified for the showing of Metro Manila cinemas in 1993, as the board of governors being the mayors that comprise Metro Manila. In particular, the mayor of Manila at the time, Alfredo Lim, was concerned of the violent, lawless image of a "Manila Boy" being promoted by the movie. The mayor not only dropped the movie from the annual festival but also threatened to ban of the movie from being shown in the city of Manila. To go around the ban, the producers agreed to drop "Manila" from the title and released the movie as just "Boy".

External links

1993 films
1990s action comedy-drama films
1990s crime comedy-drama films
Filipino-language films
Philippine comedy-drama films
1990s Tagalog-language films
1993 comedy films
1993 drama films
Films directed by Arturo San Agustin